Philip Anthony McKeon (November 11, 1964 – December 10, 2019) was an American child actor and radio personality, best known for his role as Tommy Hyatt, the son of the title character on the television sitcom Alice from 1976 to 1985.

Early life and family
McKeon was born in Westbury, New York, the son of Barbara and Donald McKeon, a travel agent. His younger sister is actress Nancy McKeon (The Facts of Life (TV series)). They are not related to actor Doug McKeon.

McKeon's professional career began when he was 4 years old as a print model. His parents took him and Nancy, then age 2, to a nearby modeling audition, and he began his career as a child model, appearing in magazines, newspapers, and television commercials. Over the next several years, he received numerous modeling jobs, followed by several parts on stage and in films. McKeon played baseball with Benoit Benjamin in 1975 in Little League Baseball in Williamsport, Pennsylvania.

Career
McKeon's big break came when Linda Lavin saw him in a Broadway performance of Medea and Jason (1974), thought he was bright and talented, and recommended him for the part of Tommy on Alice, replacing child actor Alfred Lutter Jr., who appeared in the pilot after playing Tommy in the Scorsese film opposite Ellen Burstyn. Alice was the television adaptation of the Academy Award-winning performance by Ellen Burstyn in the film Alice Doesn't Live Here Anymore (1974), directed by Martin Scorsese with its screenplay by Robert Getchell.

After Alice ended in 1985, McKeon continued to make periodic acting appearances, including Sandman (1993) and Ghoulies IV (1994). He also produced or directed films such as Teresa's Tattoo (1994), which starred his sister Nancy McKeon, Murder in the First (1995), and The Young Unknowns (2000).

After 2000, McKeon worked in radio, first in the news department at KFWB AM 980 in Los Angeles and then as co-host of morning radio show The Breakfast Taco on KWVH-LP 94.1FM in Wimberley, Texas.

Personal life and death
McKeon was named in a few magazines as a teen idol.

McKeon died in Texas on December 10, 2019, after a long illness. He was 55 years old.

Filmography

References

Citations

Sources

External links
 
 

1964 births
2019 deaths
20th-century American male actors
American male child actors
American male film actors
American male television actors
American radio hosts
Male actors from Burbank, California
Male actors from New York (state)
People from Westbury, New York
People from Wimberley, Texas
Radio personalities from Texas